The Nuclear Instrumentation Module (NIM) standard defines mechanical and electrical specifications for electronics modules used in experimental particle and nuclear physics. The concept of modules in electronic systems offers enormous advantages in flexibility, interchange of instruments, reduced design effort, ease in updating and maintaining the instruments.

The NIM standard is one of the first (and perhaps the simplest) such standard.  First defined by the U.S. Atomic Energy Commission's report TID-20893 in 1968–1969, NIM was most recently revised in 1990 (DOE/ER-0457T). It provides a common footprint for electronic modules (amplifiers, ADCs, DACs, discriminators, etc.), which plug into a larger chassis (NIM crate, or NIM bin). The crate must supply ±12 and ±24 volts DC power to the modules via a backplane; the standard also specifies ±6 V DC and 220 V or 110 V AC pins, but not all NIM bins provide them. Mechanically, NIM modules must have a minimum standard width of 1.35 in (34 mm), a maximum faceplate height of 8.7 in (221 mm) and depth of 9.7 in (246 mm). They can, however, also be built in multiples of this standard width, that is, double-width, triple-width etc.

The NIM standard also specifies cabling, connectors, impedances and levels for logic signals. The fast logic standard (commonly known as NIM logic) is a current-based logic, negative "true" (at −16 mA into 50 ohms = −0.8 volts) and 0 mA for "false"; an ECL-based logic is also specified.
Apart from the above mentioned mechanical/physical and electrical specifications/restrictions, the individual is free to design their module in any way desired, thus allowing for new developments and improvements for efficiency or looks/aesthetics.

NIM modules cannot communicate with each other through the crate backplane; this is a feature of later standards such as CAMAC and VMEbus. As a consequence, NIM-based ADC modules are nowadays uncommon in nuclear and particle physics. NIM is still widely used for amplifiers, discriminators, nuclear pulse generators and other logic modules that do not require digital data communication but benefit from a backplane connector that is better suited for high power use.

Standard Pin Assignments

See also
 BNC connectors for analog and logic signals
 Computer Automated Measurement and Control (CAMAC)
 Data acquisition
 LEMO connectors, for higher density modules
 Nuclear electronics
 RG-58 50 ohm coaxial cable for timing and logic signals
 RG-62 93 ohm coaxial cable for spectroscopy signals
 VMEbus

References

Experimental particle physics